Judith Epstein Schlanger (born 1936) is a French writer and philosopher. She is Chaim Perelman Professor Emeritus of Philosophy at the Hebrew University of Jerusalem. She has written over a dozen books on intellectual invention.

Works
 Schelling et la réalité finie, essai sur la philosophie de la nature et de l'identité, 1966
 Les métaphores de l'organisme, 1971.
 Penser la bouche pleine, 1975.
 L'invention intellectuelle, 1979.
 (with Isabelle Stengers) Les concepts scientifiques: invention et pouvoir, 1991
 La mémoire des oeuvres, 1992.
 Présence des oeuvres perdues, 2010.
 Trop dire ou trop peu: La densité littéraire, 2016.

References

1936 births
Living people
20th-century French philosophers
Academic staff of the Hebrew University of Jerusalem
French women philosophers
20th-century French women